Prince Rainer Maria Joseph Florian Ignatius Michael Gabriel Raphael Gonzaga of Saxe-Coburg and Gotha, in German: Rainer Maria Joseph Florian Ignatius Michael Gabriel Raphael Gonzaga, Prinz von Sachsen-Coburg und Gotha (4 May 1900, in Pola – after 7 January 1945). Cadet of a reigning German dynasty, Prince Rainer was the head of the House of Saxe-Coburg and Gotha-Koháry branch of the House of Wettin, heir in the female line of one of the oldest and wealthiest families of the Hungarian nobility. He is believed to have been killed in action at Budapest in 1945.

Family
He was the second son of Prince August Leopold of Saxe-Coburg and Gotha and his wife Archduchess Karoline Marie of Austria. At the time of his birth the House of Wettin ruled the Kingdom of Saxony and the Ernestine duchies in Germany, as well as the kingdoms of Belgium, Portugal, Bulgaria and the United Kingdom.

The deaths of his older brother August (1908) and his father (1922), made him the fourth in the Roman Catholic line of Saxe-Coburg-Gotha princes to inherit the legacy of the House of Koháry.

He had four sisters and two younger brothers, Prince Philipp (married with issue) and Prince Ernst (married without issue).

Significance
In addition to being in the line of succession to the Coburg throne, he possessed one of the largest fortunes in Hungary, one of the constituent realms within the Habsburg Empire, whose reign, however, he saw come to an end, along with that of the Dukes of Saxe-Coburg and Gotha, in 1918. Even after the fall of the German and Austro-Hungarian monarchies, he retained ownership of most of the vast Koháry domains, which continued to generate a princely income. He also owned the Csábrág and Szitnya castles, both in modern-day Slovakia, among other lands in Central Europe.

Marriage and issue
In Munich on 15 December 1930 Prince Rainer married, firstly, Johanna Károlyi de Károly-Patty (17 September 1906 – 17 November 1992). They had one son: 
Johann Heinrich Frederick Werner Konrad Rainer Maria, Prinz von Sachsen-Coburg und Gotha Koháry (1931–2010).

Rainer and Johanna were divorced in 1935.

In Budapest, on 13 February 1940, Rainer married, secondly, Edith de Kózol, by whom he had no children.

Ancestry

1900 births
1945 deaths
People from Pula
Hungarian nobility
House of Saxe-Coburg-Gotha-Koháry
Princes of Saxe-Coburg and Gotha
Hungarian military personnel killed in World War II